The Journal de Paris (1777–1840) was the first daily French newspaper.

The paper was founded by Antoine-Alexis Cadet de Vaux, Jean Romilly, Olivier de Corancez, and Louis d'Ussieux, in 1777, following the model of the London Evening Post.  The four-page daily paper eschewed politics in favor of popular culture, the weather, and other light-hearted culture, which made it the subject of jesting in its day.  Nevertheless, the model proved popular.  In 1784, the paper famously published an anonymous satirical letter by Benjamin Franklin encouraging Parisians to rise earlier in the day, which has been credited (though an overreach) with promoting the concept of daylight saving time.

The paper did increase its coverage of politics as dictated by French events, and was publishing a supplement in 1789 covering the National Assembly. The paper was shut down after the Insurrection of 10 August 1792 for 50 days.  With the support of Napoleon, the paper expanded its format and scope in 1811.  Though it never recovered its former glory, its most well-known later writer was Henri Fonfrède.

References

External links

Online archives include (incomplete list):
 Bnf Archives (1777-1787) (4006 issues from Bibliothèque nationale de France)
 Hathi Trust Archives (1779-1791, assorted)
 Google Books: January - June 1787; July - December 1787; May 3-4, 1788; January - June 1789; October - December 1791; January - April 1799 (? - French Republican calendar dating); September 1800 - March 1801 (? - French Republican calendar dating);March - September 1801 (? - French Republican calendar dating);  September 1801 - March 1802 (? - French Republican calendar dating); September 1802 - March 1803; March - September 1803; September 1804 - January 1805; September - December 1805; January - April 1806; May - August 1806; September - December 1807; January - April 1808; January - April 1809; July - December 1809; May - August 1810; September - October 1810; November - December 1810; January - June 1811; October - December 1811; January - June 1812; July - December 1812; July - December 1813; January - June 1814; January - April 1815; July - December 1815; January - June 1816; July - August 1817; September - December 1817; January - June 1818; July - December 1818; January - June 1819; January - June 1820; January - June 1823; July - December 1823; July - December 1824; July - December 1825; January - June 1826; July - December 1826

1777 establishments in France
1840 disestablishments in France
Publications established in 1777
Publications disestablished in 1840
Defunct newspapers published in France